Admiral Sir David Williams,  (22 October 1921 – 16 July 2012) was a senior officer in the Royal Navy and Governor of Gibraltar.

Naval career
Williams was appointed Flag Officer Second-in-Command Far East Fleet in 1970. Appointed Flag Officer, Second Flotilla from March 1971 to March 1972. He was then Director-General, Naval Manpower and Training from April 1972 to February 1974. He was then promoted to Second Sea Lord and Chief of Naval Personnel in 1974; and then Commander-in-Chief Naval Home Command from 1976 to 1979 when he retired.

Between 1980 and 1982 he was Chairman of the Royal Navy Club of 1765 & 1785 (United in 1889). On 26 October 1982 he became the Governor of Gibraltar. He held this position for three years until 19 November 1985.

He was a vice-president of the Friends of Gibraltar Heritage Society.

References

|-

|-

 

 

1921 births
2012 deaths
Governors of Gibraltar
Knights Grand Cross of the Order of the Bath
Lords of the Admiralty
People from Ashford, Kent
Royal Navy admirals
Royal Navy personnel of World War II
Military personnel from Kent